USS Snark (SP-1291) was a United States Navy patrol vessel in commission from 1917 to 1919.

Snark was built in 1917 by the Herreshoff Manufacturing Company at Bristol, Rhode Island, as a private motorboat for Carl Tucker of New York City, one of nine 62-foot 4-inch (19-meter) motorboats the company built for private owners specifically for use as patrol boats in time of war. Accordingly, the U.S. Navy acquired Snark under a free lease from Tucker in 1917 for use as a section patrol boat during World War I. She was commissioned as USS Snark (SP-1291) on 30 August 1917.

Assigned to the 5th Naval District, Snark carried out patrol duties for the rest of World War I and until March 1919.

Snark was stricken from the Navy List on 29 March 1919 and was returned to Tucker the same day.

References

Department of the Navy Naval History and Heritage Command Online Library of Selected Images: Civilian Ships: Snark (Motor Boat, 1917). Served as USS Snark (SP-1291) in 1917-1919
NavSource Online: Section Patrol Craft Photo Archive Snark (SP 1291)

Patrol vessels of the United States Navy
World War I patrol vessels of the United States
Ships built in Bristol, Rhode Island
1917 ships